The following is a timeline of the history of the city of Abu Dhabi, United Arab Emirates.

Prior to 20th century
 1761 - Drinking water found on Abu Dhabi Island; settlement begins.
 1790s - Abu Dhabi Island becomes "capital of the Bani Yas tribal confederation."
 1818 - Shakhbut bin Dhiyab Al Nahyan and Tahnun bin Shakhbut Al Nahyan become rulers of Abu Dhabi.
 1855 - Zayed bin Khalifa Al Nahyan becomes ruler of Abu Dhabi.

20th century
 1928 - Shakhbut bin Sultan Al Nahyan becomes ruler of Abu Dhabi.
 1939 - Abu Dhabi Petroleum Company established.
 1948 - Dubai-Abu Dhabi border dispute.
 1952 - Population: 4,000 in sheikdom (estimate). 
 1955 - The city's first airfield opens
 1958 - Oil discovered in Abu Dhabi.
 1962 - Oil exportation begins from offshore Das Island.
 1966 - Zayed bin Sultan Al Nahyan becomes ruler of Abu Dhabi.
 1968 - Population: 46,375.
 1969 - Al Bateen Airport begins operating on Abu Dhabi Island.
 1971
 December: Abu Dhabi becomes part of the newly formed United Arab Emirates.
 Abu Dhabi National Oil Company established.
 1972 - Al-Ittihad newspaper in publication.
 1974 - Al Fajr newspaper begins publication.
 1980
 E 11 road (Dubai-Abu Dhabi) completed.
 Central Bank of the United Arab Emirates headquartered in Abu Dhabi.
 Population: 242,975.
 1981 - Regional Gulf Cooperation Council meets in Abu Dhabi.
 1982 - Abu Dhabi International Airport established on the mainland.
 1991 - July: "Bank of Credit and Commerce International collapses. Abu Dhabi's ruling family owns a 77.4% share."
 1993 - International Defence Exhibition begins.
 1994 - Baynunah Hilton Tower built.
 2000 - Abu Dhabi Securities Exchange established.

21st century

 2001 - Abu Dhabi Mall and Marina Mall in business.
 2002 - Population: 527,000.
 2003 - July: Etihad Airways founded 
 2004 - Khalifa bin Zayed Al Nahyan becomes ruler of Abu Dhabi.
 2005 - Emirates Palace hotel in business.
 2007
 Sheikh Zayed Mosque built.
 Abu Dhabi National Exhibition Centre opens.
 2008 - Abu Dhabi Bus service begins.
 2009
 Abu Dhabi Grand Prix car race begins.
 Construction begins on Abu Dhabi National Oil Company headquarters and Saadiyat Island's Louvre Abu Dhabi.
 2010
 Sky Tower built.
 Ferrari World amusement park in business on Yas Island.
 2011
 Sheikh Zayed Bridge, Capital Gate, and Etihad Towers built.
 Guggenheim Abu Dhabi construction begins on Saadiyat Island.
 2012 - The Landmark built (tallest in city).
 2014
 Yas Mall in business.
 New York University Saadiyat Island campus built.
 2019 - Pope Francis becomes the first Pope ever to visit the Arabian Peninsula and the UAE, specifically Abu Dhabi, from 
February 3–5.
 2020 - On August 31, at around 10:15 a.m., a gas explosion occurred in a restaurant in a building along Rashid Bin Saeed Street (Airport Road). At least three persons were killed and several others were injured. A misalignment in the gas container fittings following refuelling was found to have caused the accident.
 2022 - 2022 Abu Dhabi attack

See also
 List of rulers of the Emirate of Abu Dhabi
 Timelines of other cities in United Arab Emirates: Dubai

References

Bibliography

External links

 Map of Abu Dhabi, 1994
 

 
Abu Dhabi
Abu Dhabi
United Arab Emirates history-related lists
Years in the United Arab Emirates